Nosphistica is a genus of moth in the family Lecithoceridae.

Species
Nosphistica acriella Park, 2002 (Thailand)
Nosphistica bisinuata Park, 2002 (Taiwan)
Nosphistica cornutata  (Rose, Pathania & Sood, 2007)
Nosphistica dolichina  (Wu, 1996)
Nosphistica effrenata (Meyrick, 1918) (India)
Nosphistica erratica (Meyrick, 1911) (Sri Lanka)
Nosphistica fenestrata (Gozmány, 1978) (China, Taiwan)
Nosphistica fuscolepis Park, 2002 (Taiwan)
Nosphistica metalychna (Meyrick, 1935) (China)
Nosphistica minutispina  (Wu, 1996)
Nosphistica orientana  Park, 2005
Nosphistica owadai  Park, 2005
Nosphistica parameocola (Wu, 1996) (China)
Nosphistica tarokoensis Park, 2002 (Taiwan)
Nosphistica undulata Park, 2002 (Thailand)

References

 , 2002, A revision of the genus Nosphistica Meyrick (Lepidoptera: Lecithoceridae) Zoological Studies 41 (3): 251-262 Full article: 
 , 2005, Two new species of the genus Nophistica Meyrick (Lepidoptera, Lecithoceridae) from China and Vietnam, Journal of Asia Pacific Entomology 8 (2): 123-125. Full article: 
 , 2007, A new species of Philoptila Meyrick (Lepidoptera: Lecithoceridae) from India, Oriental Insects 41: 383-385.

 
Lecithocerinae
Moth genera